Esther Lutgens is a Dutch physician and molecular biologist who is Professor of Vascular Immunopathology at Amsterdam University Medical Centre. She studies the modulation of co-stimulatory pathways and the immune system.

Early life and education 
Lutgens was a medical student at Maastricht University, where she became interested in the cardiovascular and immune systems. She remained there for doctoral research, where she investigated immune cell activation and cell turnover. She then moved to the Department of Pathology as a postdoctoral fellow. She worked alongside Mat Daemen and studied cellular proliferation in atherosclerotic plaque. She moved to the United States, and completed fellowships at Harvard Medical School and the Geisel School of Medicine. At the Harvard Medical School she worked with Peter Libby.

Research and career 
Lutgens started her independent scientific career back in the Netherlands, as a Professor at Maastricht University. She was awarded a Sofia Kovalevskaya Award in 2008 and moved to Ludwig Maximilian University of Munich. In 2011, she was appointed a Professor at the University of Amsterdam Medical Centre.

Lutgens' research considers the immune system and vascular inflammation. Her laboratory investigates atherosclerosis, and, in particular, the signalling axis between the protein CD40 and its ligand, CD40L. Lutgens identified that the CD40 ligand was expressed in atherosclerotic plaque (atheroma). Working with Biogen, Lutgens performed murine studies of these observations. She found mice that were CD40L deficient had reduced atherosclerosis.

Lutgens focussed on the signalling pathways of CD40. She found that interactions between TRAF6 and CD40L were key drivers of atherosclerosis. She has developed lipid lowering compounds that can target the TRAF6 binding pocket for CD40.

Awards and honours 
 2013 Netherlands Organisation for Scientific Research Vici Grant
 2016 ATVB Council Jeffrey M. Hoeg Award 
 2016 European Research Council Consolidator Grant
 2018 European Society of Cardiology Outstanding Achievement Award
 2020 American Heart Association Arteriosclerosis Recognition Award

Selected publications

References 

Living people
Maastricht University alumni
21st-century Dutch physicians
Dutch molecular biologists
Dutch women scientists
Year of birth missing (living people)
Academic staff of the University of Amsterdam